Putting Hartlepool First was a localist political party based in the English town of Hartlepool. It was officially registered with the Electoral Commission as Hartlepool Independents - Putting Hartlepool First.

The party was registered in 2011. In 2017, it had three councillors on Hartlepool Borough Council. The party did not operate a whip, leaving its councillors "free to vote based on their own knowledge and experience."

As of 2019, the party had no representation on the council. The party de-registered the same year.

References

External links

Locally based political parties in England
Politics of the Borough of Hartlepool